This English mathematician is sometimes confused with the Irish mathematician William S. Burnside (1839–1920).



William Burnside (2 July 1852 – 21 August 1927) was an English mathematician. He is known mostly as an early researcher in the theory of finite groups.

Burnside was born in London in 1852. He went to school at Christ's Hospital until 1871 and attended St. John's and Pembroke Colleges at the University of Cambridge, where he was the Second Wrangler (bracketed with George Chrystal) in 1875. He lectured at Cambridge for the following ten years, before being appointed professor of mathematics at the Royal Naval College in Greenwich. While this was a little outside the main centres of British mathematical research, Burnside remained a very active researcher, publishing more than 150 papers in his career.

Burnside's early research was in applied mathematics. This work was of sufficient distinction to merit his election as a fellow of the Royal Society in 1893, though it is little remembered today. Around the same time as his election his interests turned to the study of finite groups. This was not a widely studied subject in Britain in the late 19th century, and it took some years for his research in this area to gain widespread recognition.

The central part of Burnside's group theory work was in the area of group representations, where he helped to develop some of the foundational theory, complementing, and sometimes competing with, the work of Ferdinand Georg Frobenius, who began his research in the subject during the 1890s. One of Burnside's best known contributions to group theory is his paqb theorem, which shows that every finite group whose order is divisible by fewer than three distinct primes is solvable.

In 1897 Burnside's classic work Theory of Groups of Finite Order was published. The second edition (pub. 1911) was for many decades the standard work in the field. A major difference between the editions was the inclusion of character theory in the second.

Burnside is also remembered for the formulation of Burnside's problem that concerns the question of bounding the size of a group if there are fixed bounds both on the order of all of its elements and the number of elements  needed to generate it, and also for Burnside's lemma (a formula relating the number of orbits of a permutation group acting on a set with the number of fixed points of each of its elements) though the latter had been discovered earlier and independently by Frobenius and Augustin Cauchy.

He received an honorary doctorate (D.Sc.) from the University of Dublin in June 1901.

In addition to his mathematical work, Burnside was a noted rower. While he was a lecturer at Cambridge, he also coached the rowing crew team. In fact, his obituary in The Times took more interest in his athletic career, calling him "one of the best known Cambridge athletes of his day".

He is buried at the West Wickham Parish Church in South London.

Books

;

Notes

References
 Review

External links
 
 
 
 
 

1852 births
1927 deaths
19th-century English mathematicians
20th-century English mathematicians
Group theorists
People educated at Christ's Hospital
Alumni of St John's College, Cambridge
Alumni of Pembroke College, Cambridge
Academics of the Royal Naval College, Greenwich
Royal Medal winners
Second Wranglers
Fellows of the Royal Society
De Morgan Medallists